John de Ferrers, 1st Baron Ferrers of Chartley (20 June 1271 Cardiff – 1312) was the son of Robert de Ferrers, 6th Earl of Derby and Alianore de Bohun, daughter of Humphrey de Bohun and Eleanor de Braose, and granddaughter of Humphrey de Bohun, 2nd Earl of Hereford. He was both Seneschal of Gascony and Lieutenant of Aquitaine in 1312, the year of his death.

Ferrers joined the baronial opposition to King Edward in 1297, but was summoned as a baron in 1299.

He married Hawise de Muscegros, a daughter of Robert de Muscegros.

Their eldest son John (died by 1324) inherited the title Baron Ferrers of Chartley upon his father's death from poisoning in Gascony in 1312.

References

Further reading
 Jones, M.,(2004) Ferrers, Robert de, first Earl Ferrers (d. 1139), Oxford Dictionary of National Biography, Oxford University Press[ accessed 28 Oct 2007]
 Bland, W., (1887) Duffield Castle: A lecture at the Temperance Hall, Wirksworth, Derbyshire Advertiser
 Loyd, Lewis, (1951) "The Origins of Some Anglo Norman Families," Harleian Society 

01
1271 births
1312 deaths
Deaths by poisoning
Seneschals of Gascony